Anthony Barrow (6 Apr 1944) is an English former professional rugby league footballer who played in the 1960s and 1970s, and coached in the 1980s and 1990s.

Playing career

Championship final appearances
Barrow played , i.e. number 2, and scored a try in St. Helens' 35-12 victory over Halifax in the Championship Final during the 1965–66 season at Station Road, Swinton on Saturday 28 May 1966, in front of a crowd of 30,165.

County League Championships
Barrow played in St. Helens' victories in the Lancashire County League during the 1963–64 season, 1964–65 season, 1965–66 season, 1966–67 season and 1968–69 season.

Challenge Cup Final appearances
Barrow was an unused interchange/substitute, i.e. number 14, in St. Helens' 21-2 victory over Wigan in the 1966 Challenge Cup Final during the 1965–66 season at Wembley Stadium, London on Saturday 21 May 1966, in front of a crowd of 98,536, and played  in Leigh's 24-7 victory over Leeds in the 1971 Challenge Cup Final during the 1970–71 season at Wembley Stadium, London on Saturday 15 May 1971, in front of a crowd of 85,514.

County Cup Final appearances
Barrow was a non-playing interchange/substitute, i.e. number 14, in St. Helens' 12-4 victory Swinton in the 1964 Lancashire County Cup Final during the 1965–65 season at Central Park, Wigan on Saturday 24 October 1964.

Genealogical information
Tony Barrow's marriage to Kathleen (née Vaughan) was registered during third quarter of 1967 in St. Helens district. They had children; Paula Ann Barrow (birth registered during first quarter of ), and the rugby league footballer; Tony Barrow Jr. Tony Barrow Sr is the younger brother of St Helens R.F.C. Hall of Fame inductee Francis "Frank" Barrow, and the older brother of the rugby league footballer for St. Helens, and Leigh; William G. "Bill"/"Billy" Barrow.

References

External links

Search for "Barrow" at rugbyleagueproject.org
Search for "Anthony Barrow" at britishnewspaperarchive.co.uk
Search for "Tony Barrow" at britishnewspaperarchive.co.uk

1944 births
Living people
English rugby league coaches
English rugby league players
Leigh Leopards captains
Leigh Leopards players
Oldham R.L.F.C. coaches
Rugby league centres
Rugby league five-eighths
Rugby league players from St Helens, Merseyside
Rugby league wingers
St Helens R.F.C. players
Swinton Lions coaches
Warrington Wolves coaches